The Guldbagge for Best Documentary Feature is a Swedish film award presented annually by the Swedish Film Institute (SFI) as part of the Guldbagge Awards (Swedish: "Guldbaggen") to award documentary films in the Swedish motion picture industry.

Winners and nominees 
Each Guldbagge Awards ceremony is listed chronologically below, along with the winner of the Guldbagge Award for Best Documentary Feature and the director associated with the award. In the columns under the winner of each award are the other nominees for best documentary feature.

Documentary films in other categories 
Before the introduction of the award at the 36th Guldbagge Awards, documentaries were qualified for the categories of Best Film, and Best Shortfilm. The following films won the categories they were nominated in.

Best Film

Best Shortfilm

See also 
 BAFTA Award for Best Documentary
 Academy Award for Best Documentary Feature
 Academy Award for Best Documentary (Short Subject)
 Independent Spirit Award for Best Documentary Feature
 Critics' Choice Movie Award for Best Documentary Feature

Notes

References

External links 
  
  
 

Documentary Feature
Documentary film awards
Documentary Feature
Awards established in 2000
2000 establishments in Sweden